Benjamin Hodge may refer to:

 Benjamin Hodge (Desperate Housewives), a character on Desperate Housewives
 Benjamin Lewis Hodge (1824–1864), Confederate politician
 Benjamin Hodge (Kansas politician) (born 1980), former member of the Kansas House of Representatives